An Instagram face is a social trend for women to adjust their features to conform to a single template, either by applying filters to their photographs on social media, or via cosmetic surgery. The template face is young, with flawless, unwrinkled skin and plump, high cheekbones. It has catlike (uplifted) eyes and long lashes; it has a small, symmetrical nose and lush lips. It has a blank expression. The face is unambiguously Caucasian, but of ambiguous ethnicity. The face is well-tanned, with South Asian brows and eye shape, African-American lips, Caucasian nose, and Native American/Middle Eastern cheeks.

History 
Cosmetic surgery has long been used in an attempt to improve attractiveness. More recently, repeated use of Botox and hyaluronic acid fillers has replaced some surgeries since 2002. Magazines have edited photographs of celebrities to remove "flaws" for decades. In 2018, Americans underwent 7 million neurotoxin injections and 2.5 million filler injections and spent $16.5 billion on cosmetic surgery. 92% of the latter was performed on women. The Instagram face signalled a change from correcting flaws to seeking perfection. In 2015, the Kylie Jenner lip challenge produced bloodshot, bruised, and swollen lips among many people.

The Instagram face is different because such efforts now have a single target. The trend began among "professionally beautiful" women but later spread across social media, especially on Snapchat and Instagram. Facetune offers more specific editing features. The use of invasive cosmetics has become common among younger adults.

Emblematic celebrities include Kim Kardashian West, Bella Hadid, Emily Ratajkowski, and Kendall Jenner.

See also 
Body dysmorphic disorder

References

External links 

 
 
 

Instagram
Human appearance
Face